State Highway 1 (SH-1) is a state highway in Bihar state. It covers only one districts i.e. Patna district of Bihar state. This state highway starts from Zero Mile near Kumhrar and ends at NH-22 near Masaurhi.

Route
The route of SH-1 from north to south is as follows:

 Zero Mile (near Kumhrar)
 Patna ISBT
 Sampatchak
 Gauri Chak (Punpun River)
 Beldari Chak (SH-78 junction)
 Dhanarua
 Taregana 
 Masaurhi

References 

State Highways in Bihar